The Buxton Festival is an annual summer festival of opera, music and (since 2000) a literary series, held in Buxton, Derbyshire, England since its beginnings in July 1979. The 2020 festival would have run but was cancelled due to the Covid-19 crisis. The 2023 Buxton International Festival will run 6–23 July.

Origins of the present-day Festival
The origins of the Festival date to September 1937, when an annual drama festival was first held (running until 1942) in conjunction with the London-based Old Vic Theatre Company under Lilian Baylis. In addition to plays at the Buxton Opera House, the festival ran a summer school at the adjoining Playhouse Theatre. The Festival as it exists today came about because of the inspiration in the 1970s to encourage the restoration of the Buxton Opera House, a classic Frank Matcham building.

The conductor Anthony Hose (then Head of Music at Welsh National Opera) and Malcolm Fraser (then lecturing in opera at the Royal Northern College of Music in Manchester) saw its potential as a venue for an opera festival. With David Rigby, who provided the business input, they spent three years planning the first Festival while the restoration was in progress.

The restored Buxton Opera House became the venue for the first Buxton Festival in 1979 with presentations of Lucia di Lammermoor (in its first complete performance in Britain), followed by Peter Maxwell Davies' The Two Fiddlers.

Productions and performers
Productions have included rarely performed operas (such as Britten's Let's Make an Opera (1980); Domenico Cimarosa's Il matrimonio segreto (1981 and 1993); Kodály's Háry János (in its British stage premiere in 1982); Vivaldi's Griselda (1983, but not seen anywhere since its original Venice presentation in 1735); Cherubini's Médée (1984, in its original French dialogue never seen in Britain); and, from 1986, many productions of Handel's operas, as well as many others by Cimarosa (in 1989 it presented three).

Performers have included Thomas Allen, Rosalind Plowright, Alan Opie, Nigel Kennedy, Cleo Laine, John Ogdon, Alan Bates, Dame Janet Baker, Victoria de los Ángeles, Margaret Price, Lesley Garrett and Sarah Brightman. The current resident orchestra at the festival is the Northern Chamber Orchestra.

The festival continues to present less well-known opera from celebrated composers, alongside a programme of classical concerts, jazz and a thriving Literary Series. 2014's operas included Antonín Dvořák's The Jacobin, Christoph Willibald Gluck's Orfeo ed Euridice and a concert performance of Gioachino Rossini's Otello. The Festival presented its first Autumn Literary Weekend in 2014. This developed into The Big BIF Weekend in 2019 - a combination of opera, music and book events, which last took place in October 2021.

The festival has been followed by the International Gilbert & Sullivan Festival, which normally runs for three weeks in August each year in Buxton but moved to Harrogate for 2014.

Buxton Festival Fringe

The Buxton Festival Fringe is an annual open arts festival running at approximately the same time as the Buxton Festival. This year's Fringe dates are 6–24 July 2022. The festival hosts comedy, theatre, dance, music, street performances, film, performance art, talks and shows for children as well as other impromptu events. The festival celebrated its 40th Fringe in 2019 with 220 entries adding up to over 500 individual performances and making this the biggest Buxton Fringe to date. It is one of the largest fully independent Fringes in the United Kingdom, along with Brighton Festival Fringe and Edinburgh Fringe. The 2020 Fringe was mainly online with a few physical events. There were 101 events.

Since 2011, Underground Venues  has been programming events at the newly refurbished Pavilion Arts Centre and Studio with Ed Reardon, Isy Suttie, Henning Wehn and Terry Christian being among the artists who have featured. A new managed venue, The Market Place, ran for a year in 2014 and 2017 saw the arrival of another new managed venue, The Rotunda. The Green Man Gallery in Buxton has also become a significant managed venue for the Fringe.

Buxton Rock Festival of the 1970s
On 26 September 1969 an all-night Blues Festival was held in the Buxton Pavilion Gardens. Fleetwood Mac and many other top bands performed. During the early 1970s, it was best known as one of the UK's most prominent rock festivals, with most major rock bands of the day appearing, including Mott The Hoople, The Faces, Lindisfarne, Canned Heat, Chuck Berry, Nazareth, Edgar Broughton Band, Groundhogs, Sensational Alex Harvey Band, Medicine Head, Brewers Droop, Roy Wood and Wizzard. During July 2007 it was the subject of several features on Jeff Cooper's 'Cooper Collection' show on 106.6 Smooth Radio.

See also
 List of opera festivals
 Buxton Opera House

References

External links
Arts Derbyshire - Buxton Festival Fringe
  Buxton Festival website
 Buxton Fringe official website

Festival
Opera in the United Kingdom
Opera festivals
Festivals in Derbyshire
Busking venues
Theatre festivals in England
Music festivals established in 1979
Music festivals in England
1979 establishments in England